Anne Gibson may refer to:

 Anne Gibson, Baroness Gibson of Market Rasen (1940–2018), British trade unionist and peer
 Anne Gibson (badminton) (born 1968), Scottish badminton player